Ville Skinnari (born 21 February 1974) is a Finnish politician of the Social Democratic Party who has been serving as Minister for Development Cooperation and Foreign Trade in the cabinet of Prime Minister Antti Rinne since 2019.

Early career
Skinnari is a former professional ice hockey player who played in the Finnish Elite League for the club Reipas Lahti, in the Netherlands for the club Dordrecht Lions, and for the Coventry club Solihull Blaze in the British National League.

From 1995 until 1999, Skinnari worked as a freelance journalist in Japan, the Netherlands, and the United Kingdom.

Political career
Skinnari was elected to the Finnish Parliament for the Social Democratic Party in 2015, from the constituency of Häme (Tavastia). In 2019 he was re-elected to the parliament for the term 2019–2023. 

Skinnari was appointed Minister for Development Cooperation and Foreign Trade in the cabinet of Prime Minister Antti Rinne in 2019. After the collapse of the cabinet in December 2019, Skinnari continued in the same position in the following Marin Cabinet.

Other activities

International organizations
 World Bank, Ex-Officio Alternate Member of the Board of Governors (since 2019)
 OECD/UNDP Tax Inspectors Without Borders (TIWB), Member of the Governing Board (since 2019)

Non-profit organizations
 Finnish Federation for Recreational Fishing, Chair (2017–2019)
 Hockey Unlimited, Member of the Board (2014–2019)
 Lahti Energia Oy, Vice-Chair of the Board (2013–2017)

References

External links

1974 births
Living people
People from Lahti
Social Democratic Party of Finland politicians
Government ministers of Finland
Members of the Parliament of Finland (2015–19)
Members of the Parliament of Finland (2019–23)
Finnish ice hockey players
Finnish expatriates in Japan
Finnish expatriates in the Netherlands
Finnish expatriates in the United Kingdom